Kauffman House may refer to:
 Kauffman House (Grand Lake, Colorado), listed on the National Register of Historic Places (NRHP)
 William Kauffman House, in Rico, Colorado, listed on the NRHP in Colorado
 Linus B. Kauffman House, in Columbus, Ohio, listed on the NRHP in Columbus, Ohio

See also
Kaufman House (disambiguation)